Daniel Gordon Soutar (3 December 1882 – 30 November 1937) was an Australian professional golfer. He pioneered professional golf in Australia, bringing his Scottish work ethic and all-round skills to influence the game as a whole from teaching and playing, to clubmaking and course design.

Writings 
In 1906, Soutar penned The Australian Golfer in which he described the country's best golfers and golf courses, his teaching methods and much more. Jack Pollard, writing in his 1990 book Australian Golf - the Game and the Players, describes the photographs of Soutar swinging in The Australian Golfer: "Soutar had a long, sweeping swing, his supple wrists enabling him to take the club a long way back over his left shoulder before he hit the ball freely and gave it a full follow through. There was no jerk or hindrance in his swing and body turn, just a lovely free-flowing movement of the club. He was tall and fit, and usually wore a peaked cap or tam o’shanter."

Amateur wins 
1903 Australian Amateur, New South Wales Amateur
1904 New South Wales Amateur

Professional wins (9) 
 1905 Australian Open, Australian PGA Championship
 1906 Australian PGA Championship
 1907 Australian PGA Championship
 1910 Australian PGA Championship
 1922 Victorian PGA Championship
 1926 New South Wales PGA Championship
1931 Dunlop Cup (New South Wales)
1934 Dunlop Cup (New South Wales)

Team appearances
Amateur
Australian Men's Interstate Teams Matches (representing New South Wales): 1904 (winners)

References 

Scottish male golfers
Australian male golfers
Golfers from Carnoustie
Sportspeople from Angus, Scotland
Scottish emigrants to Australia
1882 births
1937 deaths